is a town located in Fukushima Prefecture, Japan. , the town had an estimated population of 3,533 in 1195 households, and a population density of 60.3 persons per km2.

Geography
Bandai is located in the northeastern part of the Aizu Basin, bordered by Yamagata Prefecture to the north. About 70% of the town is occupied by forests, with agricultural land and settlements along the hills at the southern foot of the mountains and along the Otani River. Much of the tow is within the borders of the Bandai-Asahi National Park.

Mountains : Mount Bandai, Mount Nekomadake
Rivers : Nippashi-gawa, Oya-gawa

Neighboring municipalities
Fukushima Prefecture
Kitakata
Aizuwakamatsu
Inawashiro
Kitashiobara

Climate
Bandai has a Humid continental climate (Köppen Dfb) characterized by warm summers and cold winters with heavy snowfall.  The average annual temperature in Bandai is 9.2 °C. The average annual rainfall is 1467 mm with September as the wettest month. The temperatures are highest on average in August, at around 22.7 °C, and lowest in January, at around -3.3 °C.

Demographics
Per Japanese census data, the population of Bandai has declined steadily over the past 60 years and is now much less than it was a century ago.

History
The area of present-day Bandai was part of ancient Mutsu Province. It was the center of a mountain cult based on Mount Bandai and numerous Buddhist temples were founded from the Heian period. These temples grew to have a strong military and economic power towards the Kamakura period, and were only suppressed in the Sengoku period. The area formed part of the holdings of Aizu Domain during the Edo period. After the Meiji Restoration, it was organized as part of Yama District, Fukushima Prefecture. Bandai village was created on March 31, 1889 with the establishment of the modern municipalities system, and was raised to town status in 1960.

Economy
From the early modern period, hydroelectric power generation and chemical production by Nippon Soda Co., Ltd. had been mainstays of the local economy. However, the local economy has now shifted to precision machinery production and seasonal tourism, especially golf courses and ski resorts.

Education
Bandai has two public elementary schools and one public junior high school operated by the town government. The town does not have a high school.

Transportation

Railway
 JR East –  Ban'etsu West Line

Highway

Sister city relations
 – Oliver, British Columbia, Canada

Local attractions
Mount Bandai
Bandai-Asahi National Park
Enichi-ji, noted Buddhist temple and National Historic Site

References

External links

Official Website 

 
Towns in Fukushima Prefecture